Union Christian College, Merom, a small co-educational college located in Merom, Indiana, the  United States
 Union Christian College, Aluva, in Aluva, India